Adopt a Revolution is an initiative that allows individuals and civil society groups outside Syria to "adopt" a Syrian activist group of their choice and help it to survive and succeed in the Syrian uprising (2011–present).

Donations are used by the Local Coordination Committees (LCC), a network of groups that have organized the protests, documented the uprising and disseminated that information and visuals around the world. These committees funnel medical supplies, food and telecommunication equipment such as satellite modems to activists inside Syria to keep their cause alive as the military of President Bashar al Assad pounds their cities with artillery.

Since the program launched in late 2011, the website shows two dozen LCCs in Syria have reached their funding goals. The website lists the name of the committee, information about the town and its situation and the detailed financial need. Activists say what is crucial is funding for Internet and phone communication because communications infrastructure has been destroyed in towns coming under intensified shelling such as Homs. International media have been barred from entering Syria, so the outside world is dependent on the LCCs for information from the country. "Media coverage is highly important, and it is one of the only weapons activists have," said Elias Perabo, one of the founders. "The main task is people documenting and getting footage out of the country to get a glimpse of what is happening on the ground and to show the world what the brutality is like. We are trying to smuggle in stuff  like cameras before the army comes steaming into a city, so people can film and document."

Adopt a Revolution says it does not accept government money and works through the LCCs, the Syrian Revolution General Commission, a coalition of 40 opposition groups and the Assembly of the Syrian Kurdish Youths Abroad.

Since Adopt a Revolution cannot make direct electronic funds transfers to the committees, supporters smuggle the money into the country in small amounts of cash. Committees sometimes get $900 a month, sometimes $1200. Apart from one courier, who was killed en route, everything appears to be going fairly smoothly. The committees send back reports, as their "foster parents" want to know what is happening with their money.

References

External links 
 

Development charities based in Germany
Organizations of the Syrian civil war
Organisations based in Leipzig